ECCB may refer to:

Monetary authority
Eastern Caribbean Central Bank, monetary authority of a group of eight Caribbean nations.

Scientific Conference
European Conference on Computational Biology, a scientific conference on Bioinformatics and Computational Biology
European Congress of Conservation Biology, a scientific conference on biodiversity and Conservation Biology

Religious denomination
Evangelical Church of Czech Brethren